The Independent Lawyers' Association of Myanmar (ILAM), founded 19 January 2016, is a voluntary bar association of lawyers in Myanmar (Burma), and is the first national, independent professional organisation of lawyers in Myanmar. ILAM was formed in collaboration with the International Bar Association's Human Rights Institute (IBAHRI).

References

See also 
 Bar association
Bar associations of Asia
Law of Myanmar
Organizations established in 2016
Professional associations based in Myanmar
2016 establishments in Myanmar